Centro Universitário Uninovafapi (UNINOVAFAPI) is a higher education institution located in Teresina, capital of the Brazilian state of Piauí. It was inaugurated in 2000 with the ordinance of the  Ministry of Education and the Ministry of Culture.

To enter as a student, high school graduation from a recognized institution of education is required. Every twice a year there is access through the vestibular, one at the middle of the year right before winter vacations and another selective process in the end of the year, before the summer vacations.

All the teachers have an MBA in the practice area as required to teach at the faculty.

Schools and courses

Health Sciences School 
Physiotherapy
Biomedicine
Medicine
Speech-language pathology
Nutrition
Nursing
Dentistry
Physical Education

Human Sciences School 
Law
Administration/FGV
Social Service

Technological School
Fashion

Infrastructure

Library 
The library has full access to the students, teachers and faculty staff. A digital scanner system is in use for lending books, preventing the use of false identity.

Classrooms 
The classes are equipped with a home-theater stereo sound system, datashow, and whiteboard. There are also airconditioners.

Computer Labs 
Lab 1 has 25 computers programmed for academic sources and general search on the Internet. Lab 2 has 45 line up computers, source on intranet article system and general source at Internet.

Web/Software 
Net Teacher
Net Library
Net Student
Net Coordinator
Entrance Exam
Faculty Avaliation
Intranet Article System (based on Academic OnFile)
Intranet Webmail

References

External links
  

Universities and colleges in Piauí
Private universities and colleges in Brazil
Educational institutions established in 2000
2000 establishments in Brazil